Pseuderemias mucronata, the Sinai racerunner or Blanford's sand racer, is a species of lizard found in Egypt, Sudan, Ethiopia, Eritrea, Djibouti, and Somalia.

References

Pseuderemias
Lacertid lizards of Africa
Fauna of Djibouti
Reptiles of North Africa
Vertebrates of Eritrea
Reptiles of Ethiopia
Reptiles of Somalia
Vertebrates of Sudan
Reptiles described in 1870
Taxa named by William Thomas Blanford